Porcupine is a ghost town and former mining community in Haines Borough, Alaska. Gold was discovered along Porcupine Creek in 1898, and a seasonal community sprang up in the area. Due to the transient nature of the population, permanent structures were only gradually added to the area. At the time the Porcupine District was listed on the National Register of Historic Places in 1976, about 25 structures were still standing in the area, in various stages of decay. Most of these were built during the period 1927–36, when the Sunshine Mining Company was the largest operator in the area.

See also
National Register of Historic Places listings in Haines Borough, Alaska

References

Historic districts on the National Register of Historic Places in Alaska
Ghost towns in Alaska
Haines Borough, Alaska
National Register of Historic Places in Haines Borough, Alaska
Populated places on the National Register of Historic Places in Alaska